Frederick County Public Schools may refer to
Frederick County Public Schools (Maryland)
Frederick County Public Schools (Virginia)